Matthew James Potter (born 23 January 1970) is an English former footballer and current manager of Kansas City Current in the National Women's Soccer League.

Playing career
From age 14 to 19 Potter was at Watford, where he played professionally as a central midfielder. He also played for the England under-19 national team. While at Brunel University London, he helped lead the team to a national college title in 1991.

Managerial career
In 1992, Potter moved to Long Island and joined Noga Soccer, where he coached, developed a curriculum and coordinated clinics and camps. From 1995 to 2003, he worked as a head coach and trainer at Sereno Soccer Club in Phoenix, Arizona. From 1998 he also worked on the coaching staff for the Regional IV (West) of the Olympic Development Program. He was the head coach of the Scottsdale Community College women's team for one season in 2002, leading them to the ACCAC play-offs with a winning record. In February 2003, Potter was named as the assistant coach for the Washington State Cougars women's team. However, prior to the start of the season, he was promoted to head coach in July 2003, taking over from Dan Tobias who left for the Arizona Wildcats. He coached the team for nine seasons, including three seasons with an appearance in the NCAA Division I Women's Soccer Championship (2008, 2009 and 2011). In December 2011, Potter became the head coach of the Oklahoma Sooners women's program, where he remained for eight seasons. Twice the team qualified for the NCAA Division I Women's Soccer Championship, in 2014 and 2016. In November 2019, it was announced that Potter would leave Oklahoma at the end of the season.

In January 2020, the United States Soccer Federation hired Potter as the head coach of the under-23 women's national team. He previously had served as an opponent scout for the U.S. women's program, including at the 2019 FIFA Women's World Cup in France. On 11 January 2022, Potter was announced as the head coach of Kansas City Current in the National Women's Soccer League.

Potter holds a USSF Pro, USSF Talent Scout, USSF "A" and United Soccer Coaches Premier licenses.

Personal life
Potter is a native of Mere, and graduated from West London College of Brunel University London in 1992 with an honors degree in physical education and religious, social and moral education. He is married to Olga and has one daughter and three stepdaughters.

References

1970 births
Living people
People from Mere, Wiltshire
Footballers from Wiltshire
English footballers
England youth international footballers
Association football midfielders
Watford F.C. players
Alumni of Brunel University London
English football managers
English women's football managers
Scottsdale Fighting Artichokes women's soccer coaches
Washington State Cougars women's soccer coaches
Oklahoma Sooners women's soccer coaches
Kansas City Current coaches
National Women's Soccer League coaches